Cyclone is the name given to three bolt action rifles created by British company Steel Core Designs: the LSR, which fires 7.62x51mm NATO, the MSR, which fires .338 Lapua Magnum (8.6x70mm) and the HSR, which fires .50 BMG (12.7x99mm). Cyclone rifles are primarily designed for military use, and have seen limited usage by military and law enforcement units since 2017 in marksman roles.

Design 
Cyclone rifles come pre-fitted with certain attachments and match grade parts to help maximise accuracy and general performance. Some of these include, but are not limited to:
600mm Picatinny rail
Four-lug rotating bolt
Match grade barrel
Fitted with a muzzle brake by default
Fully adjustable bipod
Low friction and corrosion-resistant coating
Two-stage trigger
High tensile steel receiver

Usage 
In the contemporary conflicts in Iraq and Syria, soldiers belonging to the Islamic State have used vehicle borne improvised explosive devices (VBIEDs), to which, anti materiel rifles, such as the Cyclone HSR are used as a cheap alternative to ATGMs. Cyclone rifles are also sold on the civilian market.

Comparison

See also 
Sniper rifle
Anti-materiel rifle
SC-76 Thunderbolt

References 

7.62×51mm NATO rifles
.338 Lapua Magnum rifles
.50 BMG sniper rifles
Sniper rifles
Anti-materiel rifles
Bolt-action rifles of the United Kingdom